Mark Olegovich Shulzhitskiy (}, born 11 July 1989) is a Russian racing driver, who entered professional racing by winning a spot in a PlayStation 3 Gran Turismo competition.

Career

GT Academy 
Born in Vladivostok, Shulzhitskiy's racing career began in karting, but stalled at the age of sixteen, as there were no major racing circuits within the local area. After graduating from Far Eastern Federal University in 2011 with a degree in oriental studies, Shulzhitskiy became Nissan PlayStation GT Academy champion for Russia, winning the competition at Silverstone in 2012. In order to acquire an international race licence, Shulzhitskiy and the three other regional winners – Peter Pyzera, Steve Doherty and Wolfgang Reip – were put through a three-month driver training programme, including race events in the United Kingdom, in order to compete in the Dubai 24 Hour race in January 2013. With the assistance of Roman Rusinov and Lucas Ordóñez – as well as Doherty and Reip – Shulzhitskiy was able to finish the race in 21st overall, and second in the SP3 class.

Blancpain Endurance Series and FIA GT Series
After his appearance in Dubai, Shulzhitskiy began competing in both the Blancpain Endurance Series and the FIA GT Series with Nissan GT Academy Team RJN. He scored his first class podium in the Blancpain Endurance Series at Le Castellet.

FIA World Endurance Championship
In 2013, Shulzitskiy made his prototype endurance racing début, competing in the FIA World Endurance Championship with Greaves Motorsport.

Racing record

Career summary

24 Hours of Le Mans results

References

External links
 

1983 births
Living people
Sportspeople from Vladivostok
Russian racing drivers
Blancpain Endurance Series drivers
FIA World Endurance Championship drivers
24 Hours of Le Mans drivers
24 Hours of Spa drivers
GT Academy participants
Far Eastern Federal University alumni
Nismo drivers
OAK Racing drivers
Greaves Motorsport drivers
Nürburgring 24 Hours drivers
European Le Mans Series drivers